Kate Collins may refer to:

 Kate Collins (actress) (born 1959), American actress
 Kate Collins (author), author of the best-selling Flower Shop Mysteries
 Kate Collins (journalist) (born 1983), Australian television presenter and journalist

See also
Katherine Collins (disambiguation)